Hoby Trey Milner (born January 13, 1991) is an American professional baseball pitcher for the Milwaukee Brewers of Major League Baseball (MLB). He previously played for the Philadelphia Phillies, Tampa Bay Rays, and Los Angeles Angels.

Career
Milner attended R. L. Paschal High School in Fort Worth, Texas and was drafted by the Washington Nationals in the 44th round of the 2009 Major League Baseball draft. He did not sign and attended the University of Texas at Austin, where he played college baseball.

Philadelphia Phillies
After his junior year he was drafted by the Philadelphia Phillies in the seventh round of the 2012 MLB draft. He made his professional debut in 2012 with the Low-A Williamsport Crosscutters, and also played for the Single-A Lakewood BlueClaws, accumulating a 7-3 record and 2.50 ERA between the two teams. He spent the 2013 season with the High-A Clearwater Threshers, recording a 12-7 record and 3.83 ERA in 26 games. He spent the 2014 season in Double-A with the Reading Fightin Phils, pitching to a 10-6 record and 4.21 ERA with 86 strikeouts. He split 2015 between Reading and Clearwater, accumulating a  2-1 record and 3.52 ERA in 30 appearances. In 2016, Milner pitched for the Triple-A Lehigh Valley IronPigs and Reading, recording a 5-4 record and 2.49 ERA in 49 games.

Milner was selected by the Cleveland Indians in the 2016 Rule 5 draft. The Indians returned Milner to the Phillies on March 24, 2017. Milner started 2017 with the Lehigh Valley IronPigs, and was called up to the Phillies on June 20. He made his MLB debut on June 24, pitching 1.0 inning and allowing 1 run against the Arizona Diamondbacks. Milner recorded a stellar 2.01 ERA in 37 appearances in 2017. After struggling to a 7.71 ERA in 10 games in 2018, Milner was designated for assignment on July 8.

Tampa Bay Rays
On July 14, 2018, the Philadelphia Phillies traded Milner to the Tampa Bay Rays for cash considerations. Milner pitched to a 6.75 ERA in 4 games for the Rays in 2018. He was designated for assignment on November 20.

He opened he 2019 season with the Durham Bulls. On August 20, the Rays selected Milner's contract. Later that day Milner made his season debut going 2 innings allowing 1 run and striking out 1. The next day he was optioned to Triple A Durham to make room for Aaron Slegers who was selected from Triple A Durham. On October 31, 2019, Milner was outrighted off of the 40-man roster and elected free agency.

Los Angeles Angels
On December 9, 2019, Milner signed a minor league deal with the Los Angeles Angels that included an invitation to spring training.  His first pitch as an Angel allowed a walkoff grand slam to Matt Olson of the Oakland Athletics on Opening Day 2020. Milner recorded an 8.10 ERA in 19 games in 2020. On December 2, Milner was nontendered by the Angels.

Milwaukee Brewers
On December 17, 2020, Milner signed a minor league contract with the Milwaukee Brewers. On May 15, 2021, Milner was selected to the active roster. Milner made 19 total appearances for Milwaukee in 2021, logging a 5.40 ERA with 30 strikeouts in 21.2 innings pitched.

On April 13, 2022, Milner collected his first career win in a victory over the Baltimore Orioles. Milner pitched in a career-high 67 contests for the Brewers in 2022, logging a 3-3 record and 3.76 ERA with 64 strikeouts in 64.2 innings of work.

On January 12, 2023, Milner agreed to a one-year, $1.025 million contract with the Brewers, avoiding salary arbitration.

Personal life
Milner is the son of Yvonne Milner and former Blue Jays catcher Brian Milner. He has been married to wife Kathryn Milner since 2018.

References

External links

1991 births
Living people
Baseball players from Fort Worth, Texas
Baseball players from Dallas
Major League Baseball pitchers
Philadelphia Phillies players
Tampa Bay Rays players
Los Angeles Angels players
Milwaukee Brewers players
Texas Longhorns baseball players
Williamsport Crosscutters players
Lakewood BlueClaws players
Clearwater Threshers players
Reading Phillies players
Indios de Mayagüez players
Lehigh Valley IronPigs players
Cardenales de Lara players
American expatriate baseball players in Venezuela
Durham Bulls players
Nashville Sounds players